Southlands College may refer to:
 Southlands College, Galle, a girls' school in Sri Lanka
 Southlands College, Roehampton, one of the four constituent colleges of the University of Roehampton, London, England

See also
Southland College
Southland College (Arkansas)
Northern Southland College